The Laser Kiwi flag, originally titled Fire the Lazer, was designed in 2015 by Lucy Gray as a proposed flag of New Zealand for the 2015–2016 New Zealand flag referendums. It has since become a social media phenomenon that has created ongoing interest in the design.

Background
 
The Laser Kiwi flag was created by Lucy Gray (see bio below) in 2015 as a proposed flag of New Zealand. During the 2015–2016 New Zealand flag referendums, the Laser Kiwi flag became a large social media phenomenon, and was used in comedy routines by comedians, such as John Oliver, discussing the flag referendum and New Zealand in general. The flag features a New Zealand fern and a kiwi shooting a green laser beam from its eyes. The description of the flag was that "the laser beam projects a powerful image of New Zealand. I believe my design is so powerful it does not need to be discussed." It was often joked by comedians that if the flag was to become the official flag of New Zealand, it would cause "fear" in New Zealand's enemies.

After the referendum, the flag's popularity made a "comeback" as it became widely available as a consumer product, and is often seen at events such as sports or concerts across and outside of New Zealand.

Lucy Gray
Lucy Gray (born ) is from New Plymouth and works as an audio-visual technician. She was a member of the youth wing of ACT New Zealand and stood in the 2014 general election in the  electorate under her birth name. Ranked 28th on the party's list and receiving 0.55% of the electorate vote, she was not elected. She left the party in 2017.

Gray moved to Auckland following her parliamentary candidacy. She produced her flag design in Microsoft Paint during an evening. Inspired by the many "deadly animals" in Australia, she took a Kiwi icon and turned it into a deadly animal. When the initial four chosen options were released for the first stage of the New Zealand flag referendums, Gray stated that she was "uninspired" by the designs as they "didn't derive much meaning" for her.

Gray is transgender and transitioned after her ACT candidacy.

References 

Flags introduced in 2015
Proposed flags of New Zealand
Laser art
Fictional kiwi
2015 in New Zealand
Flags displaying animals